The Koller Gallery (founded in 1953) is the oldest private gallery of Hungary, situated in the Castle District of Budapest. At the top floor of the three storied atelier-house, there is a memorial room for the Hungarian artist Amerigo Tot.

History 
In the post war period the gallerist György Koller (1923–1996) founded the Association of Hungarian Engravers (“RMAK”)in 1953. In 1980, the first private gallery of Hungary was opened in the atelier-house of the Hungarian-Italian sculptor Amerigo Tot. From that time on the Koller Gallery was authorized to present not only graphic artists, but also sculptures and paintings. By the year 1984, an exhibition cum auction room was established in the Hungarian National Gallery, which is known to extend cooperation with Koller Gallery. Additionally, an exhibition room was opened in the Sándor Petőfi street as well as in the Hilton Hotel in the Castle District. György Koller, the founder of the Koller Gallery, died in 1996.

In the year 2006, the grandson of György Koller became the managing director of the Koller Gallery. The aim of the gallery still is to represent Hungarian and international modern and contemporary art.

Represented artists 
From the beginning, the gallery represented contemporary artists, especially engravers and graphical artists as f.e. Miklós Borsos, Lajos Szalay, János Kass, Vladimir Szabó and Gyula Hincz. The Koller Gallery also represents modern and contemporary sculptors such as Miklós Borsos, Imre Varga, Miklós Melocco and Péter Párkányi and modern and contemporary painters, such as István Szőnyi, István Csók, Bertalan Por, István Mácsai and among the young artists Gábor Szenteleki and Mózes Incze, just to name a few. The gallery also offers art appraisals and services for art collectors.

Amerigo Tot memorial room  
The Koller Gallery has been established in the former atelier-house of the Hungarian-Italian sculptor Amerigo Tot. To pay a tribute to the artist, a permanent memorial room cum exhibition center has been opened in fall 2010.

References

External links 

 

Art museums and galleries in Hungary
Sculpture galleries
Contemporary art galleries in Europe
Art galleries established in 1953
1953 establishments in Hungary
Museums in Budapest